Loud, Mean, Fast and Dirty is the first compilation album by Peter Pan Speedrock. It contains tracks from their first four albums: Rocketfuel, Killermachine, Premium Quality... Serve Loud! and Lucky Bastards.

Track listing
"Rocketfuel"
"Goodyear"
"Rockcity"
"Dead Mechanics"
"Gotta Get Some"
"Resurrection"
"Donkey Punch"
"Next Town"
"Boom"
"Big Toy"
"Pedal To The Metal"
"Come On You"
"Bad Year For Rock N Roll"
"Dukes Of Danger"
"Megadetitas"
"Hellalujah'
"Motorblock"
"Auf Der Axe"

External links
Official Peter Pan Speedrock website
Website of Peter Pan Speedrock's local rock scene

Peter Pan Speedrock albums
2004 compilation albums